William Trant Fagan (31 January 1801 – 16 May 1859) was an Irish writer and Member of Parliament (MP) from Cork.

Family 
Fagan was the son of James Fagan and his wife Ellen Trust. On 21 June 1827, he married Mary Addis, the daughter of Charles Addis; they had four children, and lived at Feltrim in Cork.

Career 
At the general election in August 1847 he was elected as one of the two Repeal Association MPs for Cork City. defeating the sitting Repeal MP Alexander McCarthy and taking his seat in the House of Commons of the United Kingdom of Great Britain and Ireland. Later that year, he published "The life and times of Daniel O'Connell", prefacing the book with an address "To The people of Ireland" in which he described O'Connell as "the greatest man that this, or any other country, ever produced".

Fagan resigned from Parliament on 14 April 1851 by appointment as Steward of the Chiltern Hundreds to become a Commissioner of Insolvency.  He stood again as an independent Whig at the general election in July 1852, pledged to support to the formation of an Independent Irish Opposition.  He was re-elected in 1857 and at the general election on 6 May 1859, but died ten days later, aged 57.

In 1844 Fagan was elected Mayor of Cork and as an Alderman a Justice of the Peace (JP) for County Cork, and was also a Deputy Lieutenant.

References

External links 
 

1801 births
1859 deaths
Members of the Parliament of the United Kingdom for Cork City
UK MPs 1847–1852
UK MPs 1852–1857
UK MPs 1857–1859
UK MPs 1859–1865
Writers from Cork (city)
Irish biographers
Irish male non-fiction writers
Irish male writers
Male biographers
Deputy Lieutenants of County Cork
Lord Mayors of Cork
Irish Repeal Association MPs